Ngô Thanh Vân (born 26 February 1979) is a Vietnamese actress, singer and model. She is also known as Veronica Ngô or her initials NTV.

Early life and education
Ngô Thanh Vân was born on February 26, 1979, in Trà Vinh, Vietnam. She is the youngest child with two older brothers. When she was 16, her parents divorced. She and her mother migrated to Norway when she was 10. They were sponsored by a Norwegian man.

In 1999, at the age of 20, Vân returned to Vietnam where she participated in a beauty pageant organized by the magazine Women's World, and finished as second runner-up. Following this initial success, she launched her modelling career in Vietnam as a model for magazines, calendars, and fashion collections. Soon after, she had her first acting role on the small screen in Hương Dẻ, a short TV series on HTV Channel.

Career

Music career
In 2002, Vân transitioned into the music scene as a pop-dance singer with the help of producer Quốc Bảo. She recorded a duet album called Vườn tình nhân (Lovers' Garden) with established singer Tuấn Hưng.

The next year, again with the help of producer Quốc Bảo, Vân released her debut solo album, Thế giới trò chơi (Playworld), on February 26. This album was a power pop-dance LP with the theme "NTV Virus". Two music videos were filmed for the album: "Thế giới trò chơi" and "Ngày tươi sáng", a cover version of jtL's "A Better Day", which was directed by Jackie Chen. These two videos were the first Vietnamese music videos to feature professional special effects and are listed among the most expensive Vietnamese music videos to date.

In 2004, Vân followed up with her second album, Bí ẩn vầng trăng (Mystery of the Moon), which featured a moon theme, on March 15. Three videos were released from this album: "Bí ẩn vầng trăng", the cheerleader-themed "Vươn đến tầm cao" ("Reach for the Sky"), and the ballad "Khi nào em buồn" ("Whenever I'm Sad"), which was later covered by many artists including Mắt Ngọc, Minh Thuận, and Thanh Thảo.

On September 5, 2005, Vân released her third album, Con đường em đi (My Way). This album was produced by Vân herself and featured a collaboration with a group of producers called The Dreams. My Way featured multiple genres, from alternative rock to pop, R&B, and hip hop. She remixed the famous Trịnh Công Sơn song "Quỳnh Hương".

In autumn 2006, after a two-month break in America, Vân returned to Vietnam, and started recording her fourth album which she promised would be a dance anthem record. In October 2006, Vân premiered one of her new songs "I Won't Stop Loving You," a new collaboration with Quốc Bảo, on the final episode of 21st Century Woman on VTV. Due to heavy promotion for her film The Rebel, the album release was pushed back to the summer of 2007. In May 2007, Vân announced that the fourth album title would be Studio 68 and claimed that 68 was her lucky number. She released Studio 68 on January 10, 2008.

In 2006, Vân signed a contract to appear in the long-running music and comedy show Van Son, produced by Van Son Entertainment, an overseas Vietnamese music production company. She has since appeared in every Van Son DVD release to date.

During the first months of 2008, Vân began working on her next album Nước mắt thiên thần (Tears of Angel), while Studio 68 was awarded Most Creative Album in a monthly Album Vang prize.

Acting career
In 2004, Vân made her first international appearance in Rouge, a 13-part late night television series that aired on AZN Television. Rouge was produced by MTV Asia & MediaCorp Singapore and was broadcast widely in Asia and Australia. For the remainder of the year, Ngo was busy with the promotional campaign for Rouge throughout Asia and the recording of her third album. She was chosen as the favorite actress in Rouge on the MTV Asia website.

After the release of her album My Way, Vân continued acting, with many starring roles in films such as Saigon Love Story directed by Ringo Le, 2 in 1 directed by Dao Duy Phuc, and The Rebel directed by Charlie Nguyễn with Johnny Trí Nguyễn, the latter becoming (at that point) Vietnam's highest-grossing film of all time. Vân's performance was highly praised by both critics and the public, and earned her the Best Actress Award at the 15th Vietnam Film Festival. She was also nominated for Best Actress at the Golden Kite Awards for the second time. In the spring of 2007, Vân also starred in a new thriller called Ngôi nhà bí ân, which premiered in Vietnamese cinemas in November 2007.

2009 saw Vân once again starring beside Johnny Trí Nguyễn in a Chanh Phuong action movie Clash. She also opened her own talent agency called VAA.

In 2010, Vân competed as a contestant in the Vietnamese version of Dancing With The Stars. She finished as the winner of season one. After winning, Vân revealed that she would return to music in 2011. That autumn, she embarked on a national promotional tour.

In 2016, she appeared in Crouching Tiger, Hidden Dragon: Sword of Destiny and starred in Tấm Cám: The Untold Story.

In 2017, she played Paige Tico, the older sister to Rose Tico, in The Last Jedi. Although her screen time was brief, her character's death was an important act of self-sacrifice that affected the major characters in the film, especially Rose. Later in 2017, she played Tien, an Inferni elf enforcer working for Leilah, the main antagonist in the Netflix film Bright.

In 2019, she starred in Vietnamese action film Furie (Hai Phượng), which later became the highest grossing domestic film of all time in Vietnam. In 2020, she appeared in The Old Guard beside Charlize Theron and in Spike Lee‘s film Da 5 Bloods with Chadwick Boseman.

The same year, Vân was selected to jury the New York Asian Film Festival.

Personal life
After the success of The Rebel, Vân publicly revealed her relationship with co-star Johnny Trí Nguyễn, which was rumored to have ended his marriage with Cathy Viet Thi, a singer on Van Son. The couple separated in 2015.

On March 2022, Vân announced her engagement to businessman Huy Trần. She and Trần wed on May 7, 2022, at a ceremony held in the city of Da Nang.

Discography
2002: Vườn tình nhân (Lovers' Garden), featuring Tuấn Hưng
2003: Thế giới trò chơi (Playworld)
2004: Bí ẩn vầng trăng (Mystery of the Moon)
2005: Con đường em đi (My Way)
2008: Studio 68 (Heaven: The Virus Remix)
2008: Nước mắt thiên thần (Tears of Angel)

Filmography

Television

Film

References

External links

 
 

1979 births
Living people
21st-century Vietnamese actresses
21st-century Vietnamese women singers
People from Trà Vinh province
Talent managers
Vietnamese emigrants to Norway
Vietnamese dancers
Vietnamese film actresses
Vietnamese television actresses